O, more, more! (lit. The sea, oh the sea) is a 1983 Soyuzmultfilm's animated satirical film directed by Yefim Gamburg. It tells the story of young men and women on vacation. They are constantly separated by various circumstances, including the fantastic and phantasmagoric onces, but at the end they finally marry. O, more, more! parodies Soviet popular culture, i.e. popular music (Italian song "Amore-more-more..."), sugary wedding photos and souvenirs, the maniac hunt for the foreign brands and clothes (such as jeans), primitive Soviet pornography, and the cult of material prosperity.

Animators 
 Natalia Bogomolova (Наталья Богомолова)
 Elvira Maslova (Эльвира Маслова)
 Galina Zebrova (Галина Зеброва)
 Alexander Mazaev (Александр Мазаев)
 Alexander Panov (Александр Панов)
 Joseph Kuroyan (Иосиф Куроян)

References 

1983 films
1983 animated films
1980s animated short films
1980s musical films
1980s Russian-language films
Soyuzmultfilm
Films directed by Yefim Gamburg
Russian satirical films